Mallotus oppositifolius is a plant species in the genus Mallotus found in Africa and Madagascar.

The variety Mallotus oppositifolius var. lindicus is classified in the IUCN red list of vulnerable species of plants.

The aqueous and ethanol extracts of the plant show antifungal properties, and anti parasitic activity against blastocystis hominis. The bioassay-guided fractionation of an ethanol extract of the leaves and inflorescence of M. oppositifolius collected in Madagascar led to the isolation of the two new bioactive dimeric phloroglucinols mallotojaponins B and C, together with mallotophenone. These compounds show antiproliferative and antiplasmodial (antimalarial) activities.

References

External links
 Mallotus oppositifolius at gbif.org
 Mallotus oppositifolius at tropicos.org
 

oppositifolius
Plants described in 1865
Flora of Africa
Flora of Madagascar